William Mark Forster (7 October 1846 – 6 June 1921) was an Australian philanthropist, founder of the Gordon Institute for Boys and City Newsboys' Society.


Early life
Forster was born at Rothbury, England, the elder son and third child of Luke Forster and his wife Anne, née Blackett. Forster arrived in Melbourne, Victoria (Australia) on 18 October 1852 on the Ellen with his parents when he was six years old and was educated at St Luke's school, South Melbourne. On leaving school he was employed by a softgoods merchant and commission agent.

Businessman
In 1864 Forster began business for himself as a commission agent and later as a general merchant in Little Bourke Street, Melbourne, where he conducted business with the Chinese and was much respected and trusted by them. In 1871 he went to New Zealand establishing a saddlery, Forster & Son. He returned three years later went into partnership with his father in a saddlery business in Melbourne.

Philanthropist
In early 1883 Forster realized that many boys in Melbourne had nothing to occupy their evenings and were falling into bad habits. In February 1883 he invited three boys off the streets to come to his own home in Canterbury Road, Toorak, Melbourne, to meet his sons. The evening was a success, other boys were invited, and soon a society was organized which met at St John's Sunday-school. In 1885 this room was no longer available and the classes were temporarily suspended, but classes were started in other suburbs and an amalgamation was made with a boys' society conducted by William Groom at North Fitzroy. Forster then gathered the newsboys of the city together in a room in Little Collins Street, and started the Herald Boys' Try Excelsior Class, afterwards known as the City Newsboys' Society. Permissive occupancy of a piece of land in Bowen St. was granted and the Gordon Institute for Boys was built and the Newsboys' Society was transferred to it.

In 1890 the Gordon Institute was handed over to the management of Charles D. Barber, and Forster established another Newsboys' Society in a more central position at 192 Little Collins Street. Forster looked after this society with great success until 1901 when he resigned due to health and business reasons; but he remained a member of committee until his death. More than 20 years later its work was being admirably managed by Miss E. C. Onians. Forster's original society made a new start in March 1886, Mrs Margaret Hobson of South Yarra having given him some land. £2000 was collected within a few months and a hall built. Other buildings were added in later years, and the institution became in effect a boys' club, largely managed by themselves, with gymnasium, swimming-pool, a library, and many classes, the fees for which were of the most trifling nature. Included in these classes were bookkeeping, shorthand, typewriting, singing, boot-repairing, carpentry, printing, painting and others. Positions were found for boys in town and country, and frail and delicate boys who found their way to the society were often provided for at a country home at Berwick, Victoria. Other boys who had come before the police court and had been placed on probation were helped to make a fresh start in life and many of these ultimately became respected citizens. Forster's health in his later years did not allow him to give so much time to the society, but he retained his position as honorary leader with a seat on the board of management until his death on 6 June 1921. In 1918 the society was renamed the "William Forster Try Boys' Society".

Legacy
Forster was married twice, and was survived by five sons and six daughters of the first marriage, and by his second wife and one son of this marriage. The work continued after Forster's death and by 1943, 60 years after the founding of the society, over 25,000 boys had passed through the institution. One of these was the Hon. William Slater, first Australian minister to Soviet Russia, and numerous others have justified the work of the founder and his many helpers. A son, W. C. D. Forster, who had been connected with the movement all his life, was a vice-president of the society at the time of its jubilee.

References

Ruth Hoban, 'Forster, William Mark (1846–1921)', Australian Dictionary of Biography, Volume 4, MUP, 1972, pp 201–202.

1846 births
People from Rothbury
English emigrants to colonial Australia
1921 deaths
Australian philanthropists